Upper Baker Dam is a dam spanning the Baker River in northern Washington in the United States of America. It is one of two dams on the river, the other one being the Lower Baker Dam a few miles downstream. The dam is used to generate hydroelectricity and provide flood control.

Construction of the dam was finished in 1959 by Puget Sound Energy as part of a power generating scheme, the Baker River Hydroelectric Project.

Climate
Upper Baker Dam has a mediterranean climate (Köppen Csb).

References

Dams in Washington (state)
Hydroelectric power plants in Washington (state)
Buildings and structures in Whatcom County, Washington
United States power company dams
Dams completed in 1959
Puget Sound Energy